Fırlaklı is a village in the Musabeyli District, Kilis Province, Turkey. The village had a population of 127 in 2022.

The village was inhabited by Kurds in late 19th century.

References

Villages in Musabeyli District
Kurdish settlements in Kilis Province